Erskine Childers may refer to:

 Erskine Childers (author) (1870–1922), author and Irish nationalist, who served as secretary-general of the Irish delegation that negotiated the Anglo-Irish Treaty in 1921
 Erskine Hamilton Childers (1905–1974), Fianna Fáil minister who became President of Ireland, son of the above
 Erskine Barton Childers (1929–1996), UN civil servant, Senior Adviser to UN Director-General for Development and International Economic Co-operation, son of the above